Nikola Sedláčková (born 6 September 1990) is a Czech footballer who plays as a defender and has appeared for the Czech Republic women's national team.

Career
Sedláčková has been capped for the Czech Republic national team, appearing for the team during the 2019 FIFA Women's World Cup qualifying cycle.

References

External links
 
 
 

1990 births
Living people
Czech women's footballers
Czech Republic women's international footballers
Women's association football defenders
1. FC Slovácko (women) players
SK Slavia Praha (women) players
People from Kyjov
Czech Women's First League players
Sportspeople from the South Moravian Region